Chang Kai-chen and Hsieh Su-wei were the defending champions, but Chang chose not to participate, while Hsieh chose to compete at the 2018 Mutua Madrid Open.

Kaitlyn Christian and Sabrina Santamaria won the title, defeating Vera Lapko and Galina Voskoboeva in the final, 2–6, 7–5, [10–7].

Seeds

Draw

Draw

References
Main Draw

Open de Cagnes-sur-Mer - Doubles